Rashantha Sureshchandra (born 3 April 1978) is a Sri Lankan former cricketer. He played in 40 first-class and 18 List A matches between 1998/99 and 2005/06. He made his Twenty20 debut on 17 August 2004, for Kurunegala Youth Cricket Club in the 2004 SLC Twenty20 Tournament.

References

External links
 

1978 births
Living people
Sri Lankan cricketers
Kurunegala Youth Cricket Club cricketers
Singha Sports Club cricketers
Cricketers from Colombo